Susan Corrock Luby (born November 30, 1951) is a former World Cup alpine ski racer, a member of the U.S. Ski Team in the early 1970s.  Talented in all three disciplines, she had 16 top ten finishes in World Cup competition: 8 in downhill, 2 in giant slalom, and 6 in slalom.

Born in Seattle, Washington, Corrock skied as a youth at [Crysral Mountain] and later trained in Ketchum, Idaho at Sun Valley. She made her World Cup debut in January 1970 at the age of 18. Two years later, she won the bronze medal in the downhill at the 1972 Winter Olympics in Sapporo, Japan, the only podium of her international career. She later finished ninth in the slalom event, won by teammate Barbara Cochran; three Americans placed in the top ten. Corrock competed on the World Cup circuit for four seasons, retiring after the 1973 season at the age of 21.

In the real estate business, Corrock lived in Vail, Colorado, in the 1980s and later relocated to Spokane, Washington, with husband Bob Luby and their two children.

World Cup results

Season standings

Points were only awarded for top ten finishes (see scoring system).

Top ten finishes
16 top tens (8 DH, 2 GS, 6 SL)

Olympic results  

From 1948 through 1980, the Winter Olympics were also the World Championships for alpine skiing.

References

External links 
 
 Susan Corrock World Cup standings at the International Ski Federation
 
 
 

1951 births
Living people
American female alpine skiers
Olympic bronze medalists for the United States in alpine skiing
Alpine skiers at the 1972 Winter Olympics
Medalists at the 1972 Winter Olympics
People from Blaine County, Idaho
21st-century American women